Ole Børud (born December 6, 1976) is a Norwegian singer, songwriter, instrumentalist, producer, and engineer known both for his solo recordings and as a member of the groups Arnold B. Family, Schaliach, Extol, and Fleshkiller. Børud, son of the gospel singer Arnold Børud, began performing music at age five as part of Arnold B. Family, a group which would compete in the Melodi Grand Prix three times. At age twelve, he released a Christian children's music album. He later ventured into hard rock and heavy metal bands, first in the two-man project Schaliach and then in Extol and, briefly, the hardcore punk band Selfmindead. Since the early 2000s, he has also recorded several solo albums in West Coast, pop, funk, and jazz styles: Chi-Rho (2002), Shakin' the Ground (2008), Keep Movin (2011), Someday at Christmas (2012, in collaboration with Samuel Ljungblahd), Stepping Up (2014), Outside the Limit (2019) and Soul Letters (2022). He re-joined Extol in 2012, and in 2016 he co-founded a heavy metal side-project, Fleshkiller. Børud has also performed for Torun Eriksen and Sofian and collaborated with Larvik Stroband and the Oslo Gospel Choir, and has contributed to two hymn compilations, Takk, gode Gud, for alle ting: 20 sanger fra Barnesalmeboka and Søndagsskolen Synger (both in 2008). He has regularly appeared on various Norwegian television shows, including Det store korslaget and Stjernekamp, and in 2017 provided backing choral vocals in Jowst's performance of "Grab the Moment" in the 2017 Eurovision contest.

Musical career

Arnold B. Family 
Born in Hamar, Norway, Børud started his musical career at the age of five years as a singer in his family's Christian pop group Børud-gjengen, later renamed Arnold B. Family. Highly popular within Norway, Arnold B. Family participated three times in the national finals for the Eurovision Song Contest, landing in the top ten all three times. The group took second place in 1995 for its song "La oss feire livet" ("Let Us Celebrate Life"). In 1988, at age twelve, he made a solo debut with the Christian children's album Alle Skal Få Vite Det!. Børud has said that he no longer remembers much about the recording sessions. Almost thirty years later, in 2017, his niece Lisa Børud sang the song "Kjærligheten seirer" ("Love Wins") from the album when she competed in the talent show Stjernekamp.

Heavy metal and hard rock 
In the 1990s, Børud ventured into heavy metal, teaming up in 1995 with Peter Dalbakk to form a short-lived doom metal project called Schaliach, for which he played guitar, bass and drums. The group released one album, Sonrise, in 1996, and was noted for its "huge" sound, Metallica-influenced guitar style, and strong classical influences, which were likened to a "metal symphony". He joined Extol in 1996, where he played guitar and bass and provided background singing. Extol performed a highly technical mixture of death metal and progressive metal, incorporating other extreme metal styles as well as hardcore punk, orchestral music, jazz, and folk music. After recording two albums with the group, Burial and Undeceived, he left to further pursue his solo career in 2001, but briefly rejoined the group to record its third album, Synergy. In 2012, he rejoined the group, which reformed as a trio, and helped record its fifth, self-titled release. In the early 2000s, he also served for a brief period as a guitarist for the hardcore punk band Selfmindead. On February 12, 2016, Peter Espevoll of Extol announced that Børud had formed a new side-project, Fleshkiller, with his former Schaliach bandmate Dalbakk. Børud himself later announced that drummer Andreas Skorpe Sjøen also joined the band. In January 2017, it was announced that Dalbakk left the band and was replaced by Elisha Mullins. The first studio album, Awaken, debuted September 15, 2017. Børud also was featured as a vocalist and guitarist on the progressive death metal band Cognizance's single "Malignant Domain", released August 22, 2019.

As a solo artist 
Børud's first solo release as an adult, Chi-Rho (2002), featured a pop rock sound and consisted of covers of various Christian music performers such as Whiteheart, Dogs of Peace, and Rebecca St. James. However, Børud considers his subsequent release, Shakin' the Ground, his true solo debut, as it was the first featuring original music. In 2009, he was featured along with Samuel Ljungblahd and Miriam Gardner on the Joakim Arenius and Praise Unit three-track single "The Mission Field", from the album of the same name. In 2011, he released Keep Movin, which peaked at no. 27 on the Norwegian charts and no. 15 on the Swedish charts. A single was released for that album in 2011 as well, "She's Like No Other". That same year, he performed live with Santa Fe and the Fat City Horns, a concert which was later released on DVD in 2013. In 2012, Børud was featured on the song "Get Ready" by INC the Choir on the album Higher. He also appeared in 2013 on the Lars-Erik Dahle album Step into the Water for the song "Barrytown", and with his father, Arnold, on the Rune Larson song "All Shook Up" from the album Tidens Gate. Later that year collaborated with Samuel Ljungblahd for a stand-alone Christmas single, "Mary's Boy Child", released on November 8, and on December 23 the pair released a full Christmas album, Someday At Christmas. The album charted at no. 39 in Norway and no. 13 in Sweden. That year Børud also released a best-of compilation, The Best. His next studio release was Stepping Up, released on November 24, 2014, which was accompanied by the single "Maybe". On March 8, 2017, Lars-Erik Dahle, featuring Børud, released a remixed version of "Barrytown" — "Barrytown [Waveform Five Mix]" — as a single. Also that year, Ljungblahd and Børud collaborated once again for the Christmas single "O Holy Night", released on November 10. On January 18, 2019, Trine Rein featured Børud on her single "Where Do We Go". His latest studio album, Outside the Limit, was released on September 20, 2019. Three singles have been released for Outside the Limit: "Good Time", released on November 16, 2018, "Fast Enough", released on February 1, 2019, and "Outside the Limit", released August 28, 2019.

From Shakin' the Ground onward, Børud adopted a Westcoast style that mixes together funk, r&b, and soul, and Stepping Up is described as jazz pop in the vein of Steely Dan and Stevie Wonder. Outside the Limit was thought to hearken back to the 1970s and was compared to Chicago, Donald Fagen, Nikki Corvette, Al Jarreau, Phil Collins, Bruno Mars, Toto, and even Daft Punk. Other noted influences include Quincy Jones, George Duke, Earth, Wind and Fire, and Prince. Børud himself stated in one interview that his influences "could be a lot. Anything from Death to Yes to Steely Dan to Jason Falkner and so forth." Per Albrigtsen of Østlands-Posten called Børud one of the foremost artists in the funk and soul genres.

Børud has also performed for Torun Eriksen and Sofian, and collaborated with Larvik Stroband and the Oslo Gospel Choir. Also, in 2008, he collaborated with Kåre Conradi and Ingelin Reigstad Norheim along with girls from the Jeløy Church's Children's and Youth Choirs to release Takk, gode Gud, for alle ting: 20 sanger fra Barnesalmeboka, a compilation album of 20 hymns. The same year, he collaborated on another hymn compilation, Søndagsskolen Synger, with Ann Kristin Wenneberg, Marianne Bondevik, Hans Esben Gihle, and Voxkids. He appeared on the show Det store korslaget on Norway's TV 2 in 2010, and in the Eurovision Song Contest 2017, Børud sang in the backing chorus for Jowst's song "Grab the Moment". In 2018, he competed in Stjernekamp, during which he performed a duet with Lisa Børud. He was eliminated in the show's semi-finals. On April 13, 2020, Børud was featured along with Kine L. Fossheim on the single and music video "Together We Stand". The song was released by Gospel Explosion, a choral project led by Leif Ingvald Skaug. As a result of the COVID-19 pandemic, Skaug began holding online choir rehearsals, in which individuals from 70 different countries participated. Many of these choral members then collaborated long-distance to create the song.

Discography

Alle Skal Få Vite Det!  – 1988
Chi-Rho – 2002
Shakin' the Ground – 2008
Keep Movin – 2011
Someday at Christmas (with Samuel Ljungblahd) – 2012
Stepping Up – 2014
Outside the Limit – 2019
Soul Letters – 2022

Additional recording credits

References

Further reading

External links
Official website

1976 births
Living people
Norwegian performers of Christian music
Norwegian rock musicians
Norwegian jazz musicians
Norwegian pop singers
Rhythm and blues musicians
Funk musicians
Gospel musicians
Musicians from Stavern
Musicians from Hamar
21st-century Norwegian singers
Extol members
Antestor members
Christian metal musicians
Hardcore punk musicians
Norwegian black metal musicians
Child pop musicians